The church of St Thomas, the Apostle and Howard-Flaget House is a historic Roman Catholic church and home located at Bardstown, Nelson County, Kentucky. The church is a brick, cross-shaped plan with a round apse. It was designed by Baltimore architect Maximilian Godefroy and built 1813–1816. It closely resembles Godefroy's earlier St. Mary's Seminary Chapel in Baltimore, another Sulpician church. St. Thomas is the oldest Roman Catholic church in Kentucky and considered "The Cradle of Catholicism in Kentucky."

St. Thomas Roman Catholic Church and Howard-Flaget House was listed on the National Register of Historic Places in 1976.

References

External links

Saint Thomas Parish website

Roman Catholic churches completed in 1816
National Register of Historic Places in Bardstown, Kentucky
Historic American Buildings Survey in Kentucky
19th-century Roman Catholic church buildings in the United States
Roman Catholic churches in Kentucky
Churches in Nelson County, Kentucky
1816 establishments in Kentucky
Houses completed in 1816
Houses on the National Register of Historic Places in Kentucky
Houses in Nelson County, Kentucky
Clergy houses in the United States